The men's tournament for the 2022 Rugby World Cup Sevens was held in Cape Town, South Africa from September 9 to 11 at the Cape Town Stadium.

Teams 

The eight quarter-finalists from the 2018 Rugby World Cup Sevens, including the 2022 tournament host South Africa, were automatic qualifiers. The remaining 16 places were decided in the six continental regions.

Notes

Draw
The fourteen core teams from the World Rugby Sevens Series were seeded according to their points accumulated across the 2019–20 and 2021–22 seasons prior to July 2022.  

The remaining ten teams were seeded based on rankings gained at the 2020 World Rugby Sevens Challenger Series and regional ranking positions in July 2022.

Match officials
World Rugby announced a panel of ten match officials for the men's tournament.

Gianluca Gnecchi (Italy)
Adam Leal (England)
Jérémy Rozier (France)
Morné Ferreira (South Africa)
Reuben Keane (Australia)

Jordan Way (Australia)
Nick Hogan (New Zealand)
AJ Jacobs (South Africa)
Tevita Rokovereni (Fiji)
Francisco González (Uruguay)

Format
Like the previous edition, the tournament was played using a knock-out format.

 Teams in the Championship Cup competed for the Melrose Cup and gold, silver and bronze medals.
 Losing teams in the Championship Cup Quarter-finals competed for fifth place.
 Losing teams in the Championship Cup Round of 16 (second round) competed for the Challenge Trophy.
 Losing teams in the Championship Cup Pre-round of 16 (first round) competed for the Bowl.
 Losing teams in the Challenge Trophy Quarter-finals competed for 13th Place.
 Losing teams in the Bowl Quarter-finals competed for 21st Place.
 Teams entering in the Pre-round of 16 (first round) in the Championship Cup played a minimum of four matches and a maximum of five matches.
 Teams entering in the Round of 16 (second round) in the Championship Cup played four matches.

Tournament
Match results as per the official website:

All times are local (UTC+2).

Preliminary round

21st place

Bowl

13th place

Challenge Trophy

5th place

Championship Cup

Final placings

Attendance
More than 105,000 spectators attended the three day tournament.

Leading Scorers

Source:

Dream Team
The 2022 Rugby Sevens World Cup Dream team is:

See also
 2022 Rugby World Cup Sevens – Women's tournament

References

Men